Joe Parker was Scottish football manager who managed the Scottish League club Cowdenbeath. He was the first Cowdenbeath manager to manage a Scottish League match after the club's election into the league in 1905.

References 

Cowdenbeath F.C. managers
Scottish Football League managers
Scottish football managers
Year of birth missing
Year of death missing